Lasha is a Georgian masculine given name that may refer to the following notable people:
George IV of Georgia (born Lasha Giorgi, 1191–1223), king of Georgia
Lasha Bekauri (born 2000), Georgian judoka
Lasha Bugadze (born 1977), Georgian novelist and playwright
Lasha Darbaidze (born 1969), Honorary Consul of Georgia in the United States
Lasha Dekanosidze (born 1987), Georgian football player
Lasha Dvali (born 1995), Georgian football plater
Lasha Gobadze (born 1994), Georgian wrestler 
Lasha Gogitadze (born 1987), Georgian Greco-Roman wrestler
Lasha Gujejiani (born 1985), Georgian judoka
Lasha Gulelauri (born 1993), Georgian triple jumper
Lasha Imedashvili (born 1996), Russian football player
Lasha Jaiani, Georgian rugby union player
Lasha Jakobia (born 1980), Georgian football player 
Lasha Janjgava (born 1970), Georgian chess grandmaster 
Lasha Kasradze (born 1989), Georgian football defender
Lasha Khmaladze (born 1988), Georgian rugby union player 
Lasha Khutsishvili (born 1985), Georgian politician 
Lasha Lomidze (born 1992), Georgian rugby union player
Lasha Lomidze (rugby union, born 2000) (born 2000), Georgian rugby union player
Lasha Malaghuradze (born 1986), Georgian rugby union player
Lasha Macharashvili (born 1998), Georgian rugby union player 
Lasha Monaselidze (born 1977), Georgian football player
Lasha Nozadze (born 1980), Georgian football player
Lasha Parunashvili (born 1993), Georgian football midfielder 
Lasha Pipia (1975–2021), Russian judoka
Lasha Salukvadze (born 1981), Georgian football player
Lasha Shavdatuashvili (born 1992), Georgian judoka
Lasha Shergelashvili (born 1992), Georgian football player
Lasha Shindagoridze (born 1993), Georgian football player 
Lasha Tabidze (born 1997), Georgian rugby union player
Lasha Talakhadze (born 1993), Georgian weightlifter
Lasha Totadze (born 1988), Georgian football player 
Lasha Zhvania (born 1973), Georgian politician, diplomat and businessman

Georgian masculine given names